Luau is a Hawaiian feast.

Luau may also refer to:

Luau (food), a Polynesian dish
Luau, Cuanza Sul
Luau, Moxico
Luau, a dialect of Lua